Herbie is a short 16mm black and white movie by George Lucas and Paul Golding made in 1966 as part of their USC film school course. It is an abstract film with no story and no actors that depicts the reflections of moving light streaks and light flashes from traffic at night. It is set to a piece of jazz music by Herbie Hancock, whose first name was used for the title.

See also
List of American films of 1966

References

External links 
 

Short films directed by George Lucas
1966 films
Films without speech
American short films
American student films